Thea Andrews (born October 4, 1973) is a Canadian journalist and television personality in both sports and entertainment news, as well as hosting reality competition and morning shows. From October 2003 to November 2006, she served as co-host on several ESPN shows such as Cold Pizza (2003–2005), Breakfast at Churchill Downs (2004–2006), Breakfast at Pimlico (2004–2006), The ESPY Red Carpet Show (2005–2006), ESPN Hollywood (2005–2006) and Sports and Hollywood (2006). Andrews reported on horse racing, college basketball and college football for the network.

She used to host a Saturday night counter programming block against Hockey Night in Canada called Guys TV on TSN, and a Canadian cable show titled Cooking for Love. She was a correspondent and host on Entertainment Tonight from November 2006 to October 2009. Andrews hosted the first season of Top Chef Canada and Nigel Lythgoe's country music singing competition, CMT's Next Superstar. From January 2013 to July 2015, she co-hosted The Insider.

Early life and career 
Andrews was born in Toronto, Ontario to a Canadian businesswoman and a Macedonian lawyer. She attended Bishop Strachan School and was originally a "jock" before opting for theater instead. A reporter for a local cable channel as a sophomore, Andrews starred in Prom Night IV: Deliver Us from Evil in 1992. After high school, she attended Queen's University and graduated with a degree in Spanish and Latin American studies. While at Queen's University Andrews co-hosted (with Cameron Dixon) Paradigm Shift a weekly half-hour series which highlighted the works of Queen's University's Film Department.

By 1999, Andrews was a producer at Fashion Television. The new millennium found her as host of the show Cooking for Love. Soon, she was hosting Guy's TV on TSN. Though both were canceled, Andrews continued to pursue her dreams. She became a reporter on the show etalk Daily and eventually the show's host.

Acting career 
Andrews also has a list of theatre credits, including Cabaret in high school and The Vagina Monologues in 2001. She has also produced a number of shows in addition to writing internet columns for TSN. Andrews had a small role in the film Harold & Kumar Go to White Castle as the TV anchorwoman.

ESPN/ESPN2/ABC Sports 
Before her part on Cold Pizza, Andrews was seen in the ESPN series Playmakers (2003), in which she played the role of Samantha Lovett, a television sports news reporter. The role was highly controversial and The Association for Women in Sports Media formally filed a complaint for the portrayal of Lovett. Andrews disagreed with this complaint in an interview with The Plain Dealer in 2004.

Andrews joined ESPN in October 2003 as the national correspondent for Cold Pizza (2003–2005), ESPN2's signature morning show as she made her debut on October 20, 2003. Andrews' primary role on the daily weekday program (7-9 a.m. ET) was to provide live reports from sports and non-sports events as well as to present unique lifestyle features. The show was originally hosted by Jay Crawford and Kit Hoover. Eventually, Andrews became co-host.

From 2004–2006, she co-hosted the Triple Crown morning shows on ESPN2 such as Breakfast at Churchill Downs (2004–2006) and Breakfast at Pimlico (2004–2006), a program of the morning the Kentucky Oaks, Kentucky Derby and Preakness Stakes (2004–2006). She also contributed to ESPN's long extensive coverage of the Triple Crown afternoon shows (2004–2006) including the Belmont Stakes.

She also covered other big horse racing events. She served as a reporter for the Breeders Cup Simulcast Show in 2004 and 2005.

After 17 months on Cold Pizza the show began cutting both the airtime of Andrews and Kit Hoover. In an attempt to become more sports-oriented rather than a blend of sports, pop culture, and entertainment, the show dropped Andrews and Hoover altogether in March 2005. They were replaced by Dana Jacobson. While Hoover left the network in late 2006, Andrews had already agreed several months prior to be transferred to Los Angeles to co-host ESPN2's new evening entertainment show, ESPN Hollywood.

She also co-hosted The ESPY Red Carpet Show (2005–2006) with Stuart Scott in July 2005. She hosted it in July 2006 with Dana Jacobson.*  Andrews reported the sidelines for college football on ESPN and ABC

Beginning on August 15, 2005, Mario Lopez and Andrews began hosting ESPN Hollywood (2005–2006). ESPN Hollywood was a weeknight entertainment show à la Entertainment Tonight which focused more on Hollywood's relationship to the sports world. Andrews also was the producer for ESPN Hollywood.*  The show would end up cancelled in January 2006 after a management change at ESPN in which several ESPN shows were cancelled (Cheap Seats, Classic Now, etc.) and also due to poor initial ratings.

After ESPN Hollywood was cancelled, Andrews briefly hosted a segment of the latest news of the convergence between the sports and entertainment worlds called Sports and Hollywood (2006), a segment on Cold Pizza which began in April 2006. The tightened focus on sports news resulted in an end to that segment in November 2006; however, actors and other performers still stopped by the Cold Pizza studios from time to time to pitch their projects and share their love of sports.

Also after ESPN Hollywood, Andrews often reported the sidelines for College basketball for ABC Sports and ESPN and also covered Golf for ESPN. She was a contributor to ABC Sports' coverage of the 2006 Belmont Stakes. She also contributed to ESPN's coverage of the 2006 Breeders Cup.

Entertainment Tonight 
On November 16, 2006, Andrews made her debut as a correspondent on Entertainment Tonight (ET) that is where she continued to work until October 2009. She was also a regular substitute host for the show as well. She also was the weekend host of ET.

Since joining Entertainment Tonight in November 2006, Andrews has interviewed many of the industry's most newsworthy celebrities, including Will Smith, Leonardo DiCaprio, Steve Carell, Hugh Jackman, Tom Cruise, Jim Carrey, Russell Crowe, Reese Witherspoon, Jennifer Aniston, Anne Hathaway, Kirk Douglas, Marie Osmond, and Ellen DeGeneres.

Andrews has also been featured as herself on the daytime drama The Young and the Restless and has played herself several times on HBO's True Blood.

On June 30, 2007, Thea and Jay Wolf were married at the Ojai Valley Inn in Ojai, California.  They have a son, Jack Aaron, born in April 2008.

TNT/After ET 
On January 23, 2010, Andrews became co-host for the "16th Annual Screen Actors Guild Awards" Red Carpet Show for TNT with People deputy managing editor Peter Castro.. She was the host of the first season of Top Chef Canada, which premiered on April 11, 2011. She stepped down as host for the second season because she was nine months pregnant during taping and was replaced by actress Lisa Ray. However, she appeared as a judge on the second season in the third episode, when the chefs were challenged to create dishes for a baby shower in honor of her and fellow judge Shereen Arazm.

CMT's Next Superstar 

Andrews is the host of CMT's Next Superstar, a reality competition series specializing in country music, which is produced by Nigel Lythgoe.

Hosting problems 

Andrews hosted Top Chef Canada on a season where the contestants had to cook up horse meat dishes. This led to Facebook protests from various animal rights groups.

References

External links 
 
 Thea Andrews' biography at ET Online

1973 births
Canadian television reporters and correspondents
Canadian infotainers
Canadian television hosts
National Autonomous University of Mexico alumni
Journalists from Toronto
Living people
Queen's University at Kingston alumni
Women sports announcers
College football announcers
College basketball announcers in the United States
American television sports announcers
National Hockey League broadcasters
Golf writers and broadcasters
Canadian horse racing announcers
Canadian women television journalists
Canadian people of Macedonian descent
American women television journalists
American women television presenters
Canadian women television hosts
21st-century American women